Valentin Samungi (born 27 January 1942) is a retired Romanian handball player. He won the world title in 1970 and an Olympic bronze medal in 1972.

Samungi started playing handball in 1958, as a goalkeeper for CSS Bucharest. Between 1966 and 1977 he competed as a defender for Dinamo Bucharest. He was a member of the national team in 1961–1973 and played 113 matches scoring 134 goals. Samungi ended his playing career as captain of the first league team "Știința" later "Universitatea" Bucharest, his nickname was "The Satrap". In 1977 he retired from competition to coach the national junior (1977–1985) and senior teams (1989–1991). In 1991 he became advisor for the Ministry of Youth and Sports, and in 1995–1996 served as chairman of the Romanian Handball Federation (RHF). In 1996 he was appointed vice president of Dinamo Bucharest, and between 1999 and 2000 acted as secretary general of the RHF.

External links

1942 births
Living people
Romanian male handball players
CS Dinamo București (men's handball) players
Handball players at the 1972 Summer Olympics
Olympic handball players of Romania
Olympic bronze medalists for Romania
Olympic medalists in handball
Medalists at the 1972 Summer Olympics
Presidents of the Romanian Handball Federation